She Was an Acrobat's Daughter is an animated short in the Merrie Melodies series, produced by Vitaphone Productions and released by Warner Bros. Pictures, Inc. on April 10, 1937. This animated short was  directed by I. Freleng and produced by Leon Schlesinger.

Plot

The story is set at a local movie theater. The short opens with a view of the building's exterior. A sign advertises the double feature of the day, 36 Hours to Kill (1936) and His Brother's Wife (1936). The camera moves to another sign, advertising the midnight show. A total of 15 features for the price of 15 cents. The features offered reportedly include "rejected shorts". The camera next moves to the interior of the building, where an audience of cartoon animals has taken seat. At first two viewers stand up and change seats, likely seeking a better viewing position. This introduces a scene where every other member of the audience decides to change seats, resulting in constant re-positioning.

The film show begins with a newsreel called "Goofy-Tone News", produced by "Warmer Bros.". The production company of the newsreel is a pun on Warner Bros., while the newsreel itself parodies Movietone News. The slogan of Movietone, Sees All, Hears All, Knows All is parodied as Sees All - Knows Nothing. Presenter "Dole Promise" (Lowell Thomas) has trouble recalling his own name, and someone whispers it to him. The first news item is that the United States are involved in a shipbuilding race and have just constructed the longest ocean liner. The depicted ship is huge and actually covers part of the Atlantic Ocean. Its "journeys" between London and New York City actually require only the slightest of movements. The next news item features "Heddie Camphor" (Eddie Cantor) interviewing Little Oscar, a long-lost insect. Oscar rants in a high-pitched voice, and the interviewer translates for the audience: Oscar would rather stay lost.

As the newsreel continues, the camera's attention shifts to the audience. An usher points out an empty seat to a late-arriving gentleman. But the new viewer discovers that his seat only allows him to view the screen through a strange angle. He moves himself to a new seat, with no better results. Having nowhere else to go, the viewer keeps his seat and sulks in frustration. Elsewhere, a hippo has to leave his seat for some reason. He passes through a row of seats on his way to the corridor, pressing on a lot of fellow viewers while asking them to pardon him.

On screen, another newsreel begins: Nit-Wit News, featuring "Who Dehr" (Lew Lehr). His news story takes place in the town of Boondoggle, Missouri, where the bite of a mad dog has had strange effects on the population. This segment depicts townspeople acting like dogs, the mayor fighting with an actual dog over a bone, and matronly socialite Mrs. Ben Astorville acting as a pampered dog, albeit one still served by a butler. As Dehr concludes his report, he is himself bitten by one of the affected townspeople. Back in the theater, the hippo returns to his seat, pressing on his fellow viewers again.

Following the newsreels, the next part of the program is a sing-along. Maestro "Stickoutski" (Leopold Stokowski) plays his "fertilizer" (Wurlitzer pipe organ), while lyrics appear on screen for the audience to follow in singing. The lyrics are accompanied by illustrations of what they describe. The song of the day is "She Was an Acrobat's Daughter". In a gag, an irrelevant sign is depicted among the lyrics, and the audience sings its message: "please do not spit on the floor".

Afterwards, the main feature is presented, with a parody of the Leo the Lion (MGM) logo who crows like a rooster instead of roaring at the start. A parody of The Petrified Forest (1936) entitled The Petrified Florist is then shown featuring Bette Savis (Bette Davis) and Lester Coward (Leslie Howard), with rather long cast credits (the hero (Lester Coward), the shero (Bette Savis), rich man (John P Sockefeller), poor man (John Dough), beggar man (Kismet), thief (Oph Bagdad), doctor (Jekyll), lawyer (Ima Shyster), then repeats: poor man, beggar man, thief, doctor, lawyer several times). The film opens with "Coward" attempting to secure transportation via hitchhiking while reading a book. Meanwhile, in the theater, a donkey member of the audience chooses this moment to start acting as a hawker. He starts advertising various food items that he is selling in a loud voice, which results in the audience kicking him out of the building.

On screen, Howard makes his way to a desert inn and introduces himself to the waitress, Davis. When she figures him for a poet, Howard attempts to recite something. He gives a mangled rendition of Mary Had a Little Lamb (1830). In the theater, a baby goose is seated next to his father and keeps annoying the parent through constantly speaking. Either asking questions about the film they are viewing, asking for a drink of water, or asking to see a cartoon. The constant speaking annoys other audience members, who try to silence the child by intimidation. When the father protests, he is punched in the face. He in turn attempts to slap his annoying kid, who runs away.

The unsupervised child makes its way to the projection room and starts toying with the movie projector. He/she accidentally speeds up the film, then has it going backwards. Realizing the damage it has caused, the child attempts to fix the projector. But it is soon caught within the machine. The film ends with the child covered in film reels and struggling to break free.

Analysis 
The film depicts the typical audience of a movie theater in the early sound film era. The film-going audience of the era did participate in sing-alongs and group activities within the theater. But this lively-participating audience then had to turn silent. Due to technical limitations, the theaters offered poor sound quality. Listening to the dialogue of a sound film required silence. Sources of noise and distraction within a theater were annoying and disruptive to film viewers. Like other Warner Bros. animated shorts of the late 1930s, the film uses such typical nuisances and the reactions to them as a subject of comedy. The hippo who keeps changing seats and the goose who keeps talking both annoy their fellow viewers. It is the reaction of said annoyed viewers which is played for laughs.

Part of the film parodies The Petrified Forest (1936) and depicts caricatures of its leading actors, Leslie Howard and Bette Davis. The film is turned "funnier" by having an interference in the projecting booth altering and reversing its sequence of events. Donald Crafton suggests that the film also pokes fun at another figure familiar to its creators, though not necessarily the audience. A flea emerges from a purse marked with the initials "J.W.", and during the sing-along the attacking lion is called "Jack". Crafton sees both scenes as references to Jack L. Warner, who was reputedly stingy and vindictive.

There is a cameo of Adolf Hitler on screen. One of the segments of the film depicts a newsreel. It is called "Goofy-Tone News" and presented by "Dole Promise", parodying respectively Movietone News and its narrator Lowell Thomas. Inside the movie theater, a viewer has trouble viewing the newsreel. His seat only offers him a distorted view of the screen images, which are seen "at an extreme angle". The film image at this section of the newsreel is that of Hitler. Hitler is depicted marching in goose step and giving the Nazi salute. He is wearing an armband depicting a swastika.

Some gags seem to be recycled from the earlier films Bosko's Picture Show (1933) and Buddy's Theatre (1935).

Home media
 The Golden Age of Looney Tunes Volume 5, Side 3
 Looney Tunes Golden Collection: Volume 3, Disc 2

Sources
 Beck, Jerry and Friedwald, Will, Looney Tunes and Merrie Melodies: A Complete Illustrated Guide to the Warner Bros. Cartoons (Henry Holt and Company, 1989) 
 
 
 Schneider, Steve, That's All Folks!: The Art of Warner Bros. Animation, Henry Holt and Company, 1990)

References

External links
 
 
 Continuous Performance: "She Was an Acrobat’s Daughter" - essay from the Northwest Chicago Film Society

1937 films
Cultural depictions of Adolf Hitler
Merrie Melodies short films
Films scored by Carl Stalling
Short films directed by Friz Freleng
Films set in a movie theatre
Films set in Missouri
American black-and-white films
1937 animated films
1930s Warner Bros. animated short films